The Faithless is the debut full-length album by Nights Like These. It was released on June 13, 2006 by Victory Records.

Track listing
 Storming Valhalla
 Head Of Medusa
 Destroy The Stairs
 Scavenger’s Daughter
 Memento Mori
 Ghost Town Rituals
 Symphony For The Plague
 Bury The Messenger
 We Were Meant For Ruin
 Eternal Tempest
 Let The Waters Overtake Us

Personnel
Billy Bottom - Vocals
Matt Qualls - Guitars
Patrick Leatherwood - Drums
Derren Saucer - Guitars
Sebastian Rios - Bass
Andreas Magnusson - Production

References

2006 debut albums
Nights Like These albums
Victory Records albums